Christophe Raes (born 21 February 1982) is a Belgian rower. He competed in the men's double sculls event at the 2008 Summer Olympics.

References

1982 births
Living people
Belgian male rowers
Olympic rowers of Belgium
Rowers at the 2008 Summer Olympics
Rowers from Ghent